Odd Project was an American metalcore band from Orange County, California, that originally formed in 2000 and has recorded a few demos which resulted in a multi-album deal with Indianola Records. Odd Project then entered the recording studio at Zing Studio's (Killswitch Engage, From Autumn to Ashes, The Agony Scene) and recorded "The Second Hand Stopped" in just less than two weeks. With this release, they toured for over a month and a half and won a spot on the main stage at Hellfest 2004.

History 
The band was voted the "#1 Metal Band" on the now defunct MP3.com. The band has played with national acts such as Avenged Sevenfold, Atreyu, Killswitch Engage, and Norma Jean. The band has also appeared in magazines, such as Alternative Press, Metal Hammer, Revolver, and AMP.

On December 17, 2006, it was announced via their official Myspace page they would be changing their name, because of extensive member changes.

Lead vocalist Michael "Jag" Jagmin officially left Odd Project in late 2007 to become the front for A Skylit Drive.

Band members 

 Final members
 Michael "Jag" Jagmin – lead vocals (2005–2007)
 Scott Zschomler – lead guitar, backing vocals (2000–2007)
 Mike Knowlton – rhythm guitar (2007)
 Jon Kintz-Birwood – bass, backing vocals (2006–2007)
 Christian Escobar – drums (2000–2007)

 Former members
 Matt Lamb – lead vocals (2000–2005)
 Greg Pawloski – rhythm guitar (2000–2007)
 Eric Cline – bass, backing vocals (2000–2006)

Discography 
Demos
April 2002 Demo (2002)
October 2002 Demo (2002)
July 2003 Demo (2003)

Studio albums
The Second Hand Stopped (2004)
Lovers, Fighters, Sinners, Saints (2007)

References

External links 
 

Musical groups established in 2000
Musical groups disestablished in 2007
Heavy metal musical groups from California
American post-hardcore musical groups
Indianola Records artists
Musical groups from Orange County, California
Metalcore musical groups from California